Carole Elizabeth Middleton (née Goldsmith; born 31 January 1955) is a British businesswoman. She is the mother of Catherine, Princess of Wales, Philippa Matthews, and James Middleton.

Born in Perivale and brought up in Southall, London, Middleton was educated at state schools before working as a secretary. She joined British Airways and worked as a flight attendant until her marriage to Michael Middleton, a member of the Middleton family. Middleton founded Party Pieces, a mail-order party supply company, in 1987. Her first three grandchildren, Prince George, Princess Charlotte, and Prince Louis, are second, third, and fourth in line to the British throne respectively. The Middletons reside at Bucklebury Manor, in Berkshire.

Early life
Carole Elizabeth Goldsmith was born on 31 January 1955 in Perivale, London, the daughter of Ronald (1931–2003) and Dorothy Goldsmith (née Harrison; 1935–2006); she is the older sister of IT recruitment multi-millionaire Gary Goldsmith. Her paternal family are descended from coal miners, and were described as working-class. Her father was a builder, while her mother worked part-time in a jewellery store. Goldsmith spent her early years in a small house in Southall, attending the local state schools.

She initially left school aged 16, but soon returned and achieved four A Levels. Goldsmith originally planned on being a teacher, but her parents were unable to put her through college. She subsequently worked as a shop assistant for John Lewis before being hired as a secretary for British Airways. Goldsmith then transferred to ground crew, and by her marriage in 1980, was working as a flight attendant.

Career
In 1987, Middleton established Party Pieces, a company that began by making party bags and which now sells party supplies and decorations by mail order. Middleton first began the business "at her kitchen table" and distributed thousands of leaflets to advertise locally. Her husband quit his job at British Airways to join her at the company in 1989. In 1995, the firm's growth necessitated its headquarters be moved to a range of farm buildings at Ashampstead Common. The company is estimated to be worth $40 million, though accounts show that the company has lost £1.068 million during the COVID-19 pandemic.

Personal life
Goldsmith married flight dispatcher Michael Middleton on 21 June 1980 at the Church of St James in Dorney, Buckinghamshire. Her husband descended from a prominent Yorkshire family with aristocratic roots. The couple subsequently bought a Victorian house in Bradfield Southend near Reading, Berkshire. The Middletons had three children: Catherine (b. 9 January 1982), Philippa (b. 6 September 1983) and James (b. 15 April 1987.) The family moved to Jordan in 1984 before returning to West Berkshire, Bradfield Southend in 1986. In 1995, the Middletons purchased Oak Acre, a Tudor-style manor house in Bucklebury, Berkshire. In 2002, Middleton and her husband bought "with cash" a flat in Chelsea, London, in which their children lived after completing their university studies. The flat was sold in 2018. 

In 2011, her daughter, Catherine, married Prince William at Westminster Abbey. The gold chevron on the coat of arms commissioned by her husband that year is in reference to Middleton's maiden name of Goldsmith. She is a grandmother to Prince George, Princess Charlotte, and Prince Louis of Wales. And also of Arthur Michael, Grace Elizabeth Jane and Rose Matthews.  In 2012, the family bought Bucklebury Manor, in Bucklebury, West Berkshire – a Grade II listed Georgian manor house set on over 18 acres.

The Middleton family's wealth is the result of their business combined with the trust funds inherited from Olive Christiana Middleton (née Lupton), whom the BBC reported in 2011 as being Michael Middleton's aristocrat grandmother. This wealth has resulted in the Middletons being reported to be multi-millionaires.

References

External links

 Party Pieces official website
 

1955 births
Living people
20th-century English businesswomen
20th-century English businesspeople
21st-century English businesswomen
21st-century English businesspeople
British women company founders
British online retailer founders
People from Ealing
People from Bradfield, Berkshire
People from Bucklebury
British racehorse owners and breeders
Middleton family (British)